Takeaki Ayabe (Japanese: 綾部勇成, born 5 September 1980 in Kanagawa) is a Japanese racing cyclist, who last rode for the .

Major results

2007
 9th Overall Tour of Hong Kong Shanghai
2009
 8th Overall Tour de East Java
 8th Overall Tour de Hokkaido
2010
 4th Overall Tour de Hokkaido
 8th Overall Tour de Taiwan
2011
 1st Stage 4 Tour de Langkawi
 7th Overall Tour de Singkarak

References

External links

1980 births
Living people
Japanese male cyclists